Omari Akil Newton is a Canadian actor. He is best known for playing the roles of Larry Summers in Blue Mountain State and Lucas Ingram in Continuum. Newton is the co-founder of Boldskool Productions.

Early life 
Newton grew up in Montreal. His parents were immigrants from Trinidad and Tobago. In the 1990s, he went to Beaconsfield High School along with his sister. At school Newton was the co-captain of the basketball team and starter for the local football team, but also went to the drama clubs. To become a professional actor Newton took drama courses at Concordia University, where he did his BA in communication studies. He also went to the National Theatre School of Canada.

Career 
When Newton was 19 years old, he was hired by Black Theatre Workshop and got a lead role in one of their productions. He worked in the Montreal theatre scene for several years until he moved to Vancouver. During his early days in Vancouver Newton did a lot of theatre. He appeared in Romeo & Juliet with Mad Duck Theatre Collective and The Oresteia at Christ Church Cathedral.

In 2001 Newton auditioned for the role of Dalton Nemers in the teenage vampire series Vampire High. He was directly booked after his first read for the role. He later mentioned that he really enjoyed the time at the set. He also liked that his character was pivotal in the story of one of the lead Vampires. During these days it was the first role on a TV series and his biggest role on film or TV. Before that he only had a few one liners in some TV movies.

From 2010 to 2011 Newton played Larry Summers in Blue Mountain State. The college comedy series is about a fictional university and its football team. Larry was Newtons first regular role on a television series.

From 2012 to 2015 Newton starred as Lucas Ingram in Continuum.

In 2014, Diane Roberts directed Newton's play Sal Capone: The Lamentable Tragedy Of with Urban Ink Productions. Newton and Roberts' collaboration led to the formation of Boldskool Productions, a hip hop theatre company. In 2018, Boldskool re-staged Sal Capone: The Lamentable Tragedy Of with Holding Space and the NAC English Theatre. Newton began writing Sal Capone in 2008 after the police shooting of unarmed Fredy Villanueva. Newton has been commissioned by Black Theatre Workshop to write Black & Blue Matters, a companion piece to Sal Capone.

Personal life 
Newton has a twin sister named Akilah Newton.

Plays 

 Sal Capone: The Lamentable Tragedy Of

Filmography

TV shows

Film

References

External links
 
 

Year of birth missing (living people)
Living people
Canadian male film actors
Canadian male television actors
Canadian male voice actors
Canadian male stage actors
Black Canadian male actors
Male actors from Montreal
21st-century Canadian male actors
Canadian people of Trinidad and Tobago descent
Anglophone Quebec people